Richard Curl (born May 4, 1940) is a former American football player and coach. He served as the head football coach at Trenton State College in 1974, compiling a record of 5–4–1. Curl also was the head coach for the Frankfurt Galaxy of NFL Europe from 1998 to 2000. He led the Galaxy to an overall record of 18–14, including a World Bowl championship in 1999.  He was the quarterback coach and assistant head coach at the St. Louis Rams until his retirement in January 2011.

Head coaching record

College

NFL Europe

References

1940 births
Living people
American football quarterbacks
Barcelona Dragons coaches
Boston College Eagles football coaches
Frankfurt Galaxy coaches
Kansas City Chiefs coaches
TCNJ Lions football coaches
New York Jets coaches
Richmond Spiders football players
Rutgers Scarlet Knights football coaches
St. Louis Rams coaches
Virginia Cavaliers football coaches
Sportspeople from Chester, Pennsylvania
Sportspeople from the Delaware Valley
Players of American football from Pennsylvania